Dayanand Sahay was an Indian politician. He was a member of the Rajya Sabha, the upper house  of the Parliament of India.

References

1932 births
2002 deaths
Rajya Sabha members from Bihar
Rajya Sabha members from Jharkhand
Indian National Congress politicians from Jharkhand